() is a Korean term which was borrowed from the Chinese terms  (and ) and/or the Chinese term . The term  is a collective term which refers to historical official attire, which was bestowed by the government court, including Chinese courts of various dynasties. The  system was a court attire system in China which also formed part of the  system. This system was them spread to neighbouring countries and was adopted in Korea since the ancient times in different periods through the ritual practice of bestowal of clothing. Acknowledgement through bestowed robes and crowns from the Emperor of China, who held hegemony over East Asia, would give support to Korean Kings and successors, as being the authentic rulers of their country as well as confirmed the political status of the Korean kingdom in the rest of the Sinosphere. The  system in Korea was different for each kingdom and changed throughout different periods. For example, initially given by the Chinese court in ritual practice, successive  were more often than not locally manufactured in Korea with different colours and adopted into Hanbok. The , which was used as the uniform of the court officials (including the civil court officials), formed part of the  system and was used like how the suit is used in nowadays.

History and development 
Before adopting foreign systems, Korea had its own  system based on indigenous , mostly rooted in indigenous ranking systems and state religion like Mu-ism. They favoured luxurious clothes like purple clothing for the top ranks and had decorative golden metal crowns and pointy hats called adorned with metal accessories and feathers. Silla and the other three kingdoms of Korea each had a version of the Bone-rank system where each social rank were allowed only certain clothes and certain ranks in court.

The rulers and the upper class in Korea's history adopted different kinds of foreign-influenced clothing in each dynasty, mostly from China's Tang, Song, Yuan, and Ming dynasties, while the commoners were generally less influenced by these foreign trends and their indigenous aesthetic continued to be seen in their clothing. Despite wearing foreign-influenced clothing, the rulers and the upper class still wore clothing that were indigenous outside of court. Under the dominance of the Han dynasty, Goguryeo and the little states were bestowed attires and other miscellaneous items from the Han dynasty court. In Goryeo dynasty, the  system was largely influenced by the clothing system of other cultures, especially by the Han-Chinese ruled dynasties, the Mongolian Empire, the Khitan Liao dynasty (which adopted the ritual practice of bestowing  from the Later Jin in the 10th century and later imitated the practice), and the Jurchen Jin dynasty. In Korea, whenever a new dynasty would be established, the Korean ruler and his court would be bestowed official clothing from the Chinese emperor. This ritual of Chinese Emperor bestowing official attire also included the official attire of the Korean Kings in Goryeo and Joseon dynasties known as the Gonryongpo.

Goguryeo 

After Gojoseon of Liaodong was defeated by Han dynasty of China, four Chinese Commanderies known as the Han-Sagoon, were established in the region in 108 BCE. Proto-koreanic entities were in constant conflict with these states until Goguryeo eventually ousted the Chinese from those regions by early 4th century CE. One of them was Daebang Commandery was established between 204 and 314 CE, and the other one was the Nakrang Commandery which continued to exist until the early fourth century CE and transmitted the Han dynasty culture and lifestyle to the regions, including the Korean peninsula. Even after the ousting, Goguryeo court attire shows influences of the Guanfu system.

A long type of Po was introduced to Goguryeo and originated from the long  which was worn by the Han Chinese in court.

Another form of robe was the mid-calf Po, which originated from the Northern Chinese, were used to fend against cold weather; this form of robe was adopted by the Goguryeo upper class for various ceremonies and rituals; this court po was eventually modified and became the durumagi with no vents. And, what is now currently known as the  forms part of the indigenous hanbok attire as:The Han dynasty influences can also be observed in the tomb murals of Goguryeo which were primarily painted in two regions: Ji'an and Pyeongyang, which are the second and third capitals of the Goguryeo from the middle of the 4th to the middle of the 7th centuries respectively. The Goguryeo murals dating from this period in the region of Ji'an typically shows the characteristics of the people of Goguryeo in terms of morals and customs while those found in the regions of Pyeongyang would typically show the cultural influence of the Han dynasty, including figures dressed in  attire, as the Han dynasty had governed this geographical region for approximately 400 years.

The Goguryeo mural paintings found near Pyeongyang, such as the Anak Tomb No.3 of Goguryeo dated 357 AD located near Pyeongyang, shows also strong influences of the Eastern Han dynasty which appears to have continued lingering in the regions of Manchuria during the third and early fourth centuries CE. The subjects and characteristics found on the murals are derived from the murals found in the Eastern Han dynasty tombs of China. The tomb owner is depicted as an idealized official of the Eastern Han dynasty being seated in frontal position wearing a Chinese ; the closest prototype of this mural painting can be found in the mural from the Yuantaizi Tomb in Chaoyang country, Liaoning, dating from the 4th century CE. The Anak Tomb No. 3 also exerted strong influences on the subsequent development of iconography, structure, and tomb mural painting techniques found in the Goguryeo tombs.

Traces of influences from the Han dynasty continued to appear in the early 5th century Goguryeo tomb murals located in the Pyeongyang areas, such as those from the  where the ancient  worn by the owner of  tomb was red (or purple) in colour and had wide sleeves. It is also worn with a waist belt similarly to the native Korean --style.

Illustrations of maids from the same tomb are also depicted wearing clothing attire which are similar to those worn from the North and South dynasties of China to the Tang dynasty the clothing attire of these maids are different from the one worn by the maids in the murals in Ji'an.

Moreover, Goguryeo, influenced by the Chinese, also developed the ritual of bestowing attire to smaller entities, such as Silla, and Silla in turn did so to other smaller entities. 

Silla and Baekje

Southern parts of the Korean Peninsula had less influence from mainland political entities. The influence of Goguryeo can be seen in Silla court clothing who wore a similar decorative apron with triangles but under their  (top) in a more indigenous fashion. Baekje had formed its own  system with influences from Silla that in turn influenced the Japanese court attire of Yayoi and Kofun period.

North-South States period and Goryeo dynasty

Unified Silla 
The official  system of the Tang dynasty was brought into Korea in 647 AD by Kim Chunchu who travelled to the Tang to voluntarily request for clothing and belts.

Balhae 
In Balhae, the official attire of civil and military officials were issued by the state. The official court attire in Balhae varied in colour based on the rank of the official; the colours worn were purple, red, light red, and green.

Goryeo 

The , which was introduced during the United Silla period, continued to be worn as an outerwear of Goryeo officials and became part of the Goryeo's official attire. Wearing everyday clothing under  had already become a tradition since the Unified Silla Period. The royalty and aristocrats of Goryeo also wore  and  that typically followed mainland Song dynasty official attire; this can be observed in the Buddhist paintings of Goryeo era.
This ritual of bestowing attire to recognize a superior was broken during the Mongol Yuan dynasty. After Goryeo was subjugated by the Yuan dynasty of China, the Goryeo kings, the royal court, and the government had several titles and privileges downgraded to the point that they were no more the equals of the Yuan emperors. The Goryeo kings were themselves demoted from their traditional status of imperial ruler of a kingdom to the status of a lower-rank king of a vassal state; as such they were forbidden from wearing the yellow  (dragon robes) as it was reserved for the Yuan emperors. At that time, they had to wear a purple  instead of a yellow one. Goryeo kings at that time sometimes used the Mongol attire instead; several Mongol clothing elements were adopted in the clothing attire of Goryeo. Goryeo clothing-style customs also became popular at the end of the Yuan dynasty among Mongol rulers, aristocrats, queens and imperial concubines in the capital city under the influence of Empress Gi (a former Kongnyo and last empress of the Yuan dynasty, lit. "tribute women") when she was elevated as empress in 1365, a few years before the Yuan dynasty ended in 1368, and when she started to recruit many Goryeo women as court maids. According to Hyunhee Park:"Like the Mongolian style, it is possible that this Koryŏ style [Koryŏ yang] continued to influence some Chinese in the Ming period after the Ming dynasty replaced the Yuan dynasty, a topic to investigate further."The ritual bestowal of  only resumed in late Goryeo. In an attempt to restore new cultural norms which they perceived as being non-contaminated by the Mongol cultural influences, King Gongming and King U of Goryeo tired to establish amicable diplomatic relationship with the Ming dynasty and voluntarily requested to be bestowed clothing from the Ming dynasty, which included their royal attire (e.g. the ) and thus recognized the superiority of the Ming dynasty.
According to the 高麗史·舆服志, the Goryeo costume system inherited the costume system of the Tang Dynasty. The half arm was developed from the half sleeves in the Han and Wei Dynasties. In the Sui and Tang Dynasties, under the influence of the "Hufu" of the Xianbei ethnic groups in the north, the half arm became a fashionable dress for women. In the Tang Dynasty, half-arms were worn on top of the coat, or under the coat and on top of the mid-single. With the lower skirt, the half-arm shirt appeared in the form of a placket. The half arm of the Tang Dynasty spread to the Korean peninsula, and continued to be inherited and developed during the Goryeo Dynasty, becoming an important costume of the Goryeo Dynasty.

Joseon

Court clothing 
The  system of Joseon continued the one used from the late Goryeo period and based itself on an early Ming dynasty court attire. However, since the establishment of the Joseon dynasty, the Joseon court developed stronger ties with Ming China and followed the Confucian dress system which became outlined in the 《》, a legal system which established Joseon as a vassal state and recognized China as the Suzerain. As such to reinforce this strict hierarchical system, the Joseon  system had to two ranks below that of China as Joseon was a vassal state while China was the suzerain.

Even after the fall of the Ming dynasty when the Chinese empire was no longer ruled by Han Chinese people, the rulers of Joseon did not regard the Manchu as the legitimate rulers of China; instead, they viewed the Joseon court as "the only true, legitimate heir to Ming dynasty". This belief was reflected in the Joseon , which continued to show the Ming dynasty-based clothing design. It was also the pride of Joseon to preserve Confucian culture and visually manifest it through the traditional dress system of Ming dynasty,

Moreover, the animosity caused by the invasion by Later Jin fuelled this notion and continued due to the Qing invasion of Joseon.

Korean Empire 
Only Emperor Gojong and Emperor Sunjong were able to wear the yellow .

Wedding dress 
The commoner men were only allowed to wear  on the day of their wedding. The wedding  was usually deep blue or violet in colour.

Types of  

The  was worn when officers had an audience with the king at the palace.

It was worn by civil and military officials when the King would hold memorial services at the Royal Ancestral Shrine where he would perform ancestor veneration ritual, called .

It was worn from the time of King Gongmin of Goryeo to the time of King Yeongchin in 1922. However, the early Joseon  was different from the one developed and worn in the late Joseon and during the Korean empire.

It was also the official court attire for the high-ranking military and civil officials; they wore it when they would meet with the King and was worn for important ceremonies. Examples of special occasions were the national festivals, or announcement of royal decrees. The  consisted of a wide-sleeved, red silk gauze robe which was worn over a blue inner robe; a red apron was worn in the front of back. To indicate the rank of the officials, officials wore ; the  had gold stripes which would mark its wearer's rank.

The  was the attire which projected the authority of the Chinese Emperor in the Sinosphere. The  was used a ceremonial attire by the Joseon kings, kings, crown prince, and crown grandson from the Goryeo period through the Joseon period.

The Korean  differed from the  worn by the Chinese Emperor as the King of Joseon were feudal kings. As feudals kings, the Kings of Joseon were not allowed to use the twelve beaded strings instead they had to use nine beaded strings. Moreover, they were supposed to wear a robe in their  which was decorated with nine out of the Twelve Ornaments and thus their this robe was referred . There were also instances when Korean kings wore the  reserved for the Emperor.

Following the fall of the Ming dynasty, the Joseon court decided to establish their own  system in accordance to their own national customs under the reign of King Yeonjo in 1744. Until 1897, King Yeonjo's guidelines concerning the Joseon  system remained in effect; some changes were later on implemented with the proclaiming of the Korean Empire. The Joseon  was thus localized and developed into its current form through time.

The  was worn as a daily official clothing.

The  was related to military affairs.

Gallery

See also 

 Guanfu
 Mianfu / Myeonbok
 Chinese influence on Korean culture

Notes

References

Korean clothing